Glyptothorax ater is a species of catfish that was first described by Anganthoibi and Vishwanath in 2011. Glyptothorax ater is a species in genus Glyptothorax, family Sisoridae and order Siluriformes. No subspecies are listed in Catalogue of Life.

The species is found in the Kaladan River basin in Mizoram State, India.

References 

Glyptothorax
Taxa named by Nongmaithem Anganthoibi
Taxa named by Waikhom Vishwanath
Fish described in 2011